The Avian Java is a British high-wing, single-place, advanced sports hang glider, designed by Steve Elkins and Neil Hammerton and produced by Avian Limited of Hope Valley, Derbyshire.

Design and development
The Java was designed as an advanced recreational hang glider. It was later developed into the "topless" Java Comp 150 which dispensed with the kingpost and top wire rigging, although it retained the lower flying wires. The Java Comp 150 later evolved into the Avian Cheetah competition glider. All Java models are British Hang Gliding and Paragliding Association certified.

The Java 155 model is typical of the line and is made from aluminum tubing, with the wing covered in Dacron sailcloth. Its  span wing has a nose angle of 125° and an aspect ratio of 7.0:1.

The Java 155 can be folded up to a  package,  in length for ground transportation on a car top. It can also be further broken down to a length of  when required for airline or similar space-restricted travel.

Variants
Java 140
Java 150
Circa 2003 version no longer in production.
Java 155
Java Comp 150
Circa 2003 "topless" competition version no longer in production, replaced by the Avian Cheetah.

Specifications (Java 155)

References

External links
Official website archive on Archive.org

Hang gliders